Hanne Brinkmann (born Johanna Marie Luise Elisabeth Brinkmann; 22 September 1895 – 29 July 1984) was a German actress. She appeared in 24 films between 1915 and 1929.

Selected filmography
 Laugh Bajazzo (1915)
 The Unmarried Woman (1917)
 Devoted Artists (1919)
 During My Apprenticeship (1919)
 The Duty to Live (1919)
 The Girl and the Men (1919)
 Catherine the Great (1920)
 The Last Hour  (1921)
 Mother and Child (1924)
 Annemarie and Her Cavalryman (1926)
 Countess Ironing-Maid (1926)
 U-9 Weddigen (1927)
 The Weavers (1927)
  Dyckerpotts' Heirs (1928)
 What's Wrong with Nanette? (1929)

References

External links

1895 births
1984 deaths
German film actresses
20th-century German actresses
Actors from Hanover